Raymond Stephen "Ray" Johnston (born 5 May 1981) is an English football manager and former goalkeeper most recently with Tiverton Town.

Johnston started his career as a youth team player for Bristol Rovers, where he eventually signed professional terms in 1998. Despite being a former England schoolboy international, Johnston could only manage to appear in one league game with The Pirates, a 4–3 victory against Macclesfield Town in 1999.

He joined Bath City in 2002, appearing in 6 games. He was the backup to first choice keeper Mark Hervin. An injury at the start of the 2003 season left Johnston 3rd choice so he chose transfer to Bishop Sutton.

Along the way, Johnston found small roles with Weston-super-Mare and Frome Town.

Ray joined Clevedon Town at the start of the 2005 season and played in 41 league games for them, appearing in an additional 9 cup games. While Johnston was the first choice keeper for Clevedon, he led them to promotion to the Southern Football League Premier Division. He was inexplicably released before the start of the next season.

Johnston found his way back to Frome Town in October 2006, but was once again out the door before the season was over in 2007. It was reported that Gloucester City put in a seven day's notice for him on 29 January 2007 and he joined up with The Tigers soon after. His debut with Gloucester came on 3 February 2007.

Eventually Johnston found himself at Tiverton Town, but was released by manager Martyn Rogers upon the signing of Steve Book and Johnston's inability to fully recover from an Achilles tendon tear and ankle problems.

In 2011 Johnston became manager of Western League Division One side Portishead Town.

At the beginning of the 2012–2013, Johnston took over as manager of Wells City F.C, in the Western League Premier Division. The club finished 19th and were subsequently relegated to the Western League Division One at the end of the season.

Johnston was then appointed as the assistant manager of Odd Down F.C in the 2013–2014 season, with Terry Moore as the club's manager. This was a very successful season, which saw the club finish 4th in the Western League Premier Division, the clubs highest ever finish at the time, and currently the clubs second highest finish. Johnston then took over the reins upon Moore's decision to step down, leading them to 5th in his first season. Johnston then went on to win the Western League Premier Division in only his second year as manager of the club, during the 15/16 season. This was the first and only time that Odd Down have won a division at that level. Despite applying to the FA for promotion to the Southern League, Odd Down failed the ground grading requirements, so runners-up Barnstaple Town were awarded with promotion instead.

Johnston stepped down in 2018, and after 6 months away took over at Hallen. The club finished 12th in his first full season, and in the 19/20 season Hallen were 4th in the league when the season was unfortunately curtailed due to the Covid outbreak, although PPG dropped them to 6th in the table. A poor start to the 20/21 season saw the club win just 1 point in their first 5 games, and Johnston left following a 2-1 defeat at Bridgwater United F.C. 

On 3 June 2021, it was announced that Johnston would take over the vacant position at Southern Football League Division One South club, Mangotsfield United. His first win at the club was a 3-0 victory at home to Western League outfit, Tavistock AFC, in the FA Cup Preliminary Round. He went 8 league games before getting his first league win at the club, a 3-1 victory at home to relegation rivals, Cinderford Town. The reverse fixture saw the end of Johnston’s tenure, with a 3-0 defeat at Cinderford leaving Mangotsfield with just 16 points after 24 games, 1 point behind Cinderford and occupying the final relegation place in 18th. The club released the following statement on 9 February 2022, " Mangotsfield United FC has today parted company with 1st Team Manager Ray Johnston. Ray joined at the start of this season along with Terry Moore who have both worked tirelessly throughout the season for the club, for which we are all very grateful. With a quarter of the season remaining, the club feels that a fresh outlook is needed to reinvigorate the team. We would like to thank Ray and Terry for all their work this season and wish them all the best for the future.".

In July 2022, it was confirmed that Johnston would take over at Western League Division One outfit, Radstock Town.

Ray continues at the helm at Radstock Town FC.

Honours

As a manager
Odd Down
Western League Premier Division champions: 2015-16

Individual
Western League Premier Division Manager of the Season: 2015-2016 (? Needs clarification)

References

External links
 Bath City player profile
 Gloucester player profile

1981 births
Living people
Footballers from Bristol
English footballers
Association football goalkeepers
Bristol Rovers F.C. players
National League (English football) players
Bath City F.C. players
Bishop Sutton A.F.C. players
Weston-super-Mare A.F.C. players
Frome Town F.C. players
Clevedon Town F.C. players
Gloucester City A.F.C. players
Tiverton Town F.C. players